Philip Moore  may refer to:
Philip Moore, Baron Moore of Wolvercote (1921–2009)
Philip Moore (organist) (born 1943), organist and Master of the Music at York Minster
Philip F. Moore (1874–1936), Newfoundland plumber and politician
Philip Henry Moore (1799–1880), Canadian businessman and politician
Philip Moore (Medal of Honor) (1853–?), United States Navy sailor and recipient of the Medal of Honor
Philip Moore (scholar), Manx clergyman and scholar

See also
Phillip Moore, American politician
Phil Moore (disambiguation)